The , also known as , is the first of the two elements that identify years in the Japanese era calendar scheme. The second element is a number which indicates the year number within the era (with the first year being ""), followed by the literal "" meaning "year".

Era names originated in 140 BCE in China, during the reign of the Emperor Wu of Han. As elsewhere in East Asia, the use of era names was originally derived from Chinese imperial practice, although the Japanese system is independent of the Chinese, Korean, and Vietnamese era-naming systems. Unlike these other similar systems, Japanese era names are still in use. Government offices usually require era names and years for official papers.

The five era names used since the end of the Edo period in 1868 can be abbreviated by taking the first letter of their romanized names. For example, S55 means Shōwa 55 (i.e. 1980), and H22 stands for Heisei 22 (2010). At 62 years and 2 weeks, Shōwa is the longest era to date.

While the  started on the day after the death of the Emperor Hirohito (8 January 1989), the Reiwa era began the day after the planned and voluntary abdication of the 125th Emperor Akihito. Emperor Akihito received special one-time permission to abdicate, rather than serving in his role until his death, as is the rule. His elder son, Naruhito, ascended to the throne as the 126th Emperor of Japan on 1 May 2019.

Overview

The system on which the Japanese era names are based originated in China in 140 BC, and was adopted by Japan in 645 AD, during the reign of Emperor Kōtoku.

Although the regular practice of proclaiming successive era names was interrupted in the late seventh century, it was permanently re-adopted in 701 during the reign of Emperor Monmu (697–707). Since then, era names have been used continuously up through the present day.

Historical nengō
Prior to the Meiji period, era names were decided by court officials and were subjected to frequent change. A new era name was usually proclaimed within a year or two after the ascension of a new emperor. A new era name was also often designated on the first, fifth and 58th years of the sexagenary cycle, because they were inauspicious years in Onmyōdō. These three years are respectively known as kakurei, kakuun, and kakumei, and collectively known as sankaku. Era names were also changed due to other felicitous events or natural disasters.

In historical practice,  starts whenever the emperor chooses; and the first year continues until the next lunar new year, which is understood to be the start of the nengō's second year.

Era names indicate the various reasons for their adoption. For instance, the nengō , during the Nara period, was declared due to the discovery of copper deposits in Chichibu. Most nengō are composed of two kanji, except for a short time during the Nara period when four-kanji names were sometimes adopted to follow the Chinese trend. Although there currently exist a total of 248 Japanese era names, only 73 kanji have been used in composing them. Out of these 73 kanji, 31 of them have been used only once, while the rest have been used repeatedly in different combinations.

The vast majority of Japanese Era Names were used for less than 10 years, with two being used for less than a year. Only 28 have been used for more than 10 years and less than 30 years. Only Heisei, Oei, Meiji, and Showa have been used for more than 30 years.

Nengō in modern Japan
Mutsuhito assumed the throne in 1867, during the third year of the  era. This system is similar to the now-defunct Chinese system used since the days of the Ming dynasty. The Japanese nengō system differs from Chinese practice, in that in the Chinese system the era name was not updated until the year following the emperor's death.

In modern practice,  starts immediately upon the emperor's accession and ends on 31 December. Subsequent years follow the Gregorian calendar.

Thus, since 1868, there have only been five era names assigned: Meiji, Taishō, Shōwa, Heisei, and Reiwa, each corresponding with the rule of only one emperor. Upon death, the emperor is thereafter referred to by the era of his reign.
 
To call the current emperor by the current era name, i.e. "Reiwa", even in English, is a faux pas, as this is – and will be – his posthumous name. Use of the emperor's given name (i.e., "Naruhito") is rare, and is considered vulgar behaviour in Japanese.

The Emperor Akihito abdicated on 30 April 2019, necessitating a change in nengō.

Periods without era names
The era name system that was introduced by Emperor Kōtoku was abandoned after his death; no era names were designated between 654 and 686. The system was briefly reinstated by Emperor Tenmu in 686, but was again abandoned upon his death about two months later. In 701, Emperor Monmu once again reinstated the era name system, and it has continued uninterrupted through today.

Although use of the Gregorian calendar for historical dates became increasingly common in Japan, the traditional Japanese system demands that dates be written in reference to era names. The apparent problem introduced by the lack of era names was resolved by identifying the years of an imperial reign as a period.

Although in modern Japan posthumous imperial names correspond with the eras of their reign, this is a relatively recent concept, introduced in practice during the Meiji period and instituted by law in 1979. Therefore, the posthumous names of the emperors and empresses who reigned prior to 1868 may not be taken as era names by themselves. For example, the year 572—the year in which Emperor Bidatsu assumed the Chrysanthemum Throne – is properly written as "" (Bidatsu-Tennō Gannen, "the first year of Emperor Bidatsu"), and not "" (Bidatsu Gannen, "the first year of Bidatsu"), although it may be abbreviated as such. By incorporating both proper era names and posthumous imperial names in this manner, it is possible to extend the nengō system to cover all dates from 660 BCE through today.

Unofficial era name system
Currently, there are over 40 confirmed shinengō, most of them dating from the middle ages. Shinengō used prior to the reestablishment of the era name system in 701 are usually called .

Because official records of shinengō are lacking, the range of dates to which they apply is often unclear. For example, the well-known itsunengō  is normally said to refer to 650–654 CE; a poetic synonym for the Hakuchi era. However, alternate interpretations exist. For example, in the Nichūreki, Hakuhō refers to 661–683 CE, and in some medieval temple documents, Hakuhō refers to 672–685 CE. Thus, shinengō may be used as an alternative way of dating periods for which there is no official era name.

Kyūshū nengō
Edo period scholar Tsurumine Shigenobu proposed that , said to have been used in ancient Kumaso, should also be considered a form of shinengō. This claim is not generally recognized by the academic community.

Software support

Character sets
These are included in Unicode: Code points U+32FF (㋿), U+337B (㍻), U+337C (㍼), U+337D (㍽) and U+337E (㍾) are used for the Reiwa, Heisei, Shōwa, Taishō and Meiji eras, respectively.

Calendar libraries
Certain calendar libraries support the conversion from and to the era system, as well as rendering of dates using it.

Since the release of Java 8, the Japanese calendar is supported in the new Date and time API for the year Meiji 6 (1873) onwards.

Support for the new era in Japanese imperial transition of 2019

Computers and software manufacturers needed to test their systems in preparation for the new era which began on 1 May 2019.  Windows provided a test mechanism to simulate a new era ahead of time. Java Development Kit 11 supported this era using the placeholders "" for Japanese, "NewEra" for other languages. The final name was added in JDK 12.0.1, after it was announced by the Japanese government.

Unicode code point U+32FF (㋿) was reserved for representing the new era name, Reiwa.

The list of Japanese era names is the result of a periodization system which was established by Emperor Kōtoku in 645. After 701, sequential era names developed without interruption across a span of centuries. As of 1 April 2019, there have been 239 era names.

List of Japanese era names
To convert a Japanese year to a Gregorian calendar year, find the first year of the Japanese era name (also called nengō). When found, add the number of the Japanese year, then subtract 1.

Asuka period

Nara period

Heian period

Kamakura period

Nanboku-chō period

Southern Court

Northern Court

Muromachi period

Azuchi–Momoyama period

Edo period

Modern Japan
The "one reign, one era name" system was implemented in 1868 AD.

Non- periods
Unofficial non- periods before 701 are called . Pre-Taika chronology intervals include:
Reign of Emperor Jimmu, 660–581 BC
Reign of Emperor Suizei, 581–548 BC
Reign of Emperor Annei, 548–510 BC
Reign of Emperor Itoku, 510–475 BC
Reign of Emperor Kōshō, 475–392 BC
Reign of Emperor Kōan, 392–290 BC
Reign of Emperor Kōrei, 290–214 BC
Reign of Emperor Kōgen, 214–157 BC
Reign of Emperor Kaika, 157–97 BC
Reign of Emperor Sujin, 97–29 BC
Reign of Emperor Suinin, 29 BC–AD 71
Reign of Emperor Keikō, AD 71–131
Reign of Emperor Seimu, 131–192
Reign of Emperor Chūai, 192–201
Regency of Empress Jingū, 201–270
Reign of Emperor Ōjin, 270–313
Reign of Emperor Nintoku, 313–400
Reign of Emperor Richū, 400–406
Reign of Emperor Hanzei, 406–412
Reign of Emperor Ingyō, 412–454
Reign of Emperor Ankō, 454–457
Reign of Emperor Yūryaku, 457–480
Reign of Emperor Seinei, 480–485
Reign of Emperor Kenzō, 485–488
Reign of Emperor Ninken, 488–499
Reign of Emperor Buretsu, 499–507
Reign of Emperor Keitai, 507–534
Reign of Emperor Ankan, 534–536
Reign of Emperor Senka, 536–540
Reign of Emperor Kinmei, 540–572
Reign of Emperor Bidatsu, 572–586
Reign of Emperor Yōmei, 586–588
Reign of Emperor Sushun, 588–593
Reign of Emperor Suiko, 593–629
Reign of Emperor Jomei, 629–645

Post-Taika chronology intervals not covered by the  system include:
Reign of Empress Saimei, 655–662 ... Saimei (period)
Reign of Emperor Tenji, 662–672 ... Tenji (period)
Reign of Emperor Kōbun, 672–673 ... Kōbun (period) or Sujaku (or Suzaku)
Reign of Emperor Tenmu, 673–686 ... Tenmu (period) or Hakuhō period
Reign of Empress Jitō, 687–697 ... Jitō (period)
Reign of Emperor Monmu, 697–701 ... Monmu (period)

See also
Calendar
Japanese calendar
Japanese imperial year
Jikkan Jūnishi (sexagenary cycle)
Regnal name
Regnal years worldwide

Notes

Citations

References
 
 
 Daijirin, 2nd edition.
 Daijisen, 1st edition.
 Kōjien, 5th edition.
 
 
 Ponsonby-Fane, Richard. (1959).  The Imperial House of Japan. Kyoto: Ponsonby Memorial Society. OCLC 194887
  Nihon Ōdai Ichiran
 
 
 
  .
  .
  .
 
  .

External links
Nengō converter

 
Calendar eras
Era name